Bellingshausen Station (Russian: станция Беллинсгаузен) is a Russian (formerly Soviet) Antarctic station at Collins Harbour, on King George Island of the South Shetland Islands. It was one of the first research stations founded by the Soviet Antarctic Expedition in 1968. It is also the location of Trinity Church, the only permanently staffed Eastern Orthodox church in Antarctica.

The station is named for the 19th-century Russian explorer of the Antarctic Fabian von Bellingshausen.

The station is connected by unimproved roads to the nearby stations: Chilean Base Presidente Eduardo Frei Montalva, Chinese Great Wall Station, and Uruguayan Artigas Base.

It is antipodal to a location in Russian Siberia, ~400 km west from Yakutsk.

In October 2018, it was the site of the first attempted murder in Antarctica.

Climate
The Antarctic Peninsula and its nearby islands are considered to have the mildest living conditions in Antarctica. Bellingshausen Station's climate is strongly influenced by the surrounding ocean. Under the Köppen system, it is one of the few locations in Antarctica classified as a tundra climate rather than an ice cap climate. With only 591.2 hours of sunshine per year, the weather is often unsettled and cloudy throughout the year with precipitation in the form of snow, rain and drizzle occurring often. On average,  of precipitation falls per year.

Gallery

In popular culture
On January 21, 2014, American tattoo artist Lyle Tuttle set up an impromptu tattoo station in a scientist's guesthouse where he tattooed his signature tattoo—his autograph—on project assistant/tattoo historian Dr. Anna Felicity Friedman, making him the first person to tattoo on all seven continents.

See also
 List of Antarctic field camps
 List of Antarctic research stations

References

External links

United States Antarctic Inspection Team 2006: Report of Inspections under Article VII of the Antarctic Treaty and Article 14 of the Protocol on Environmental Protection. March 21, 2007(Includes detailed description of this and some nearby stations)
Official website Arctic and Antarctic Research Institute
AARI Bellingshausen Station
 COMNAP Antarctic Facilities
 COMNAP Antarctic Facilities Map
Bellingshausen Station Photos

Geography of King George Island (South Shetland Islands)
Outposts of the South Shetland Islands
Russia and the Antarctic
Soviet Union and the Antarctic
1968 establishments in Antarctica